Swamy Sreenarayana Guru is a 1986 Indian Malayalam film, directed by Krishnaswamy. The film stars Adoor Bhavani, K. P. A. C. Azeez, Divyashree and KPAC Sunny in the lead roles. The film has musical score by Mohammed Subair.

Cast
Adoor Bhavani
K. P. A. C. Azeez
Divyashree
KPAC Sunny
K. V. Sivadasan
L. P. Athiyannoor
Master Sabu
Nisha Chowdhary
Ravi Menon
Vanchiyoor Madhavan Nair

Soundtrack
The music was composed by Mohammed Subair and the lyrics were written by Dr. L. Salim, Brahmasri Anandaji Gurudeva Thiruvadikal, Sreenarayana Guru and Vayalar Madhavankutty.

Notes
Swamy Sreenarayana Guru is the debut independent movie of G. Krishnaswamy. Later he has directed movies like  Koodiayattam (1985), Paavadaprayathil (1989) Maanmizhiyaal (1990), Njan Anaswaran (2013), Ula (2018) etc. Previously he worked as an assistant director of P. Padmarajan's Peruvazhiyambalam (1979). He has directed documentaries like "Aayusum Aarogyavum Aayurvedhathil","Rabies","Hare Shivagiri". He is the chairman of History & Epic Fundamental Research.

References

External links
 

1986 films
1980s Malayalam-language films